Pink Floyd bootleg recordings are the collections of audio and video recordings of musical performances by the British rock band Pink Floyd, which were never officially released by the band. The recordings consist of both live performances and outtakes from studio sessions unavailable in official releases. In some cases, certain bootleg recordings may be highly prized among collectors, as at least 40 songs composed by Pink Floyd have never been officially released.

During the 1970s, bands such as Pink Floyd created a lucrative market for the mass production of unofficial recordings with large followings of fans willing to purchase them. In addition, the huge crowds that turned up to these concerts made the effective policing of the audience for the presence of recording equipment virtually impossible. Vast numbers of recordings were issued for profit by bootleg labels.

Some Pink Floyd bootlegs exist in several variations with differing sound quality and length because sometimes listeners have recorded different versions of the same performance at the same time. Pink Floyd was a group that protected its sonic performance, making recording with amateur recording devices difficult. In their career, Pink Floyd played over 1,300 concerts, of which more than 350 were released as bootlegged recordings (sometimes in various versions). Few concerts have ever been broadcast (or repeated once they were broadcast on television), especially during 'the golden age' of the group from 1966 to 1981.

Pink Floyd was one of the mainstays of the bootleg industry in the 1970s. In 1999, the group was mentioned on BPI's list of most bootlegged British artists of all time.

One of the best known ROIO's by Pink Floyd is Best of Tour '72: Live at the Rainbow Theatre with a concert performed on 20 February 1972. This bootleg includes one of the first performances of The Dark Side of the Moon. One year and one month before the official release of that same album, the bootleg had already sold over 120,000 copies.

In 2008, the Pink Floyd bootleg Madison Square Garden, New York, NY – 2 July 1977 was mentioned on the Yahoo's Top 10 of Best Bootlegs of All Time.

Earliest bootlegs 

Most of Pink Floyd's early bootlegs concern performances from the European A Saucerful of Secrets Tour and the A Saucerful of Secrets US Tour. Most of these bootlegs were released by the label "Ace Bootlegs Production".

In January 1996, the label See For Miles Records released the bootleg album "Psychedelic Games for May" which includes a collection of Syd Barrett era Floyd, featuring a pre-Floyd acetate, rough mixes of the early singles plus BBC TV and the unreleased single "Scream Thy Last Scream".

As late as 2004, a bootleg album entitled "Outtakes From Outer Space" emerged from Israel on the dubious-sounding "Hippie Shit Label", featuring a compilation of studio session recordings and outtakes, some mentioned above. The track listing was:

 Lucy Leave (First Pink Floyd-Studio-Session)
 I'm a King Bee (First Pink Floyd-Studio-Session)
 Interstellar Overdrive (Studio-Session, 31 October 1966)
 Astronomy Domine (Live in London, 12 May 1967)
 Experiment (Studio outtakes 1967)
 Flaming (BBC-Session, 30 September 1967)
 The Gnome (BBC-Session, 30 September 1967)
 Matilda Mother (BBC-Session, 30 September 1967)
 The Scarecrow (BBC-Session, 30 September 1967)
 Vegetable Man (BBC-Session, 19 December 1967)
 Pow R. Toc H. (BBC-Session, 19 December 1967)
 Scream Thy Last Scream (BBC-Session, 19 December 1967)
 Jugband Blues (BBC-Session, 19 December 1967)
 Silas Lane (Studio outtakes 1967)
 Flaming (Single version, available only on USA Tower label)
 Reaction in G (Live in Rotterdam 12 October 1967)
 Milky Way (Studio outtake)

1969

During the two one-week recording sessions in November and December 1969 of the soundtrack for Michelangelo Antonioni's Zabriskie Point at International Recording in Rome, Pink Floyd experienced for the first time a studio leak. Three out-takes appeared on a bootleg album Omay Yad, also known under titles as Oneone, Fingal's Cave and Rain in the Country.

With the advent of a 1997 deluxe reissue of the movie soundtrack on a double compact disc, four previously unreleased Pink Floyd out-takes were also revealed. Almost simultaneously, a 15-track bootleg CD of the complete sessions appeared that revealed additional works in progress, among them a track that was long referred to by Pink Floyd as "The Violent Sequence". It was penned by Richard Wright for a riot scene in the movie and although unreleased in any form officially, was incorporated into their live set as an acoustic piano piece in the early part of the year. It was a forerunner to the melody of "Us and Them", which featured on their 1973 album The Dark Side of the Moon.

1970: Atom Heart Mother tour

1971 
At least 34 bootlegs of different concerts from 1971 were released (not counting the several bootlegs of each concert).

Dark Side of the Moon Tour 

Sometimes the smaller record mastering and pressing plants simply hid the bootleg work when record company executives would come around (in which case the printed label could show the artist and song names) and other times they would print labels with fictitious names. For example, the 1972 Pink Floyd bootleg called Brain Damage was released under the name The Screaming Abdabs.

In January 1972, Pink Floyd debuted the live performance of their album The Dark Side of the Moon before its release. Many of Pink Floyd bootlegs date back from this period. Most of these bootlegs contain a pre-release version of the entire album.

1972

1973 

The bootleg Supine in the Sunshine contains an audience live recording with extended versions of two songs from the soundtrack Obscured by Clouds (1972); namely the title track (5:38) and "When You're In" (7:48).

Yeeshkul! is so named because the bootlegger, or someone close to him, mentions the word several times during the performance. The name has inspired a forum for discussing Pink Floyd bootlegs which shut down on February 28, 2023.

Pink Floyd 1974 tours 

The bootleg British Winter Tour, a recording of the 19 November show in Stoke-on-Trent was a notable bootleg released in 1975. It featured the three new songs that Pink Floyd were playing on that tour. It sold an estimated 50,000 copies. The record was issued with the lyrics to the songs, and the quality of presentation convinced a number of buyers that the album was a bona fide follow-up to The Dark Side of the Moon. The British Phonographic Industry were not impressed, and attempted to find out who the bootleggers were, with the intent of prosecuting them.

Wish You Were Here Tour (1975)

In the Flesh Tour (1977) 

The bootleg Animals Instincts concerns the recording of the Pink Floyd concert at 9 May 1977, at the Oakland Coliseum in Oakland.

The Wall Tour (1980–1981) 

 – "Under Construction", also released as "The Wall Demos" (demo tape from the recording of The Wall in 1978, unofficially released by bootleggers. The songs here are not the same versions as those officially released on The Wall album.)
 1 February – "The Wall Rehearsals", also released as "Behind the Wall" and "Brick by Brick"
 7 February – "Azimuth Coordinator, part 3" a.k.a. "The Wall – Sport Arena L.A."
 8 February – "The Wall 08 feb 80"
 10 February – "The Wall – L.A. Sport Arena"
 13 February – "L.A. Sport Arena – 2/13/1980"
 28 February 1980 – Untitled LP with "hammers" cover, also released as "Behind the Wall", "Brick by Brick", "Nassau Coliseum Definitive Edition" and "The Wall From The Master Tape"
 6 August – "The Show Must Go On", a.k.a. "The Wall on wrpi 91.5" and "Bars in the Window"
 8 August – "The Wall Earl's Court 8 August 1980"
 9 August – "Divided We Fall", also released as "The Wall Live at Earls Court August 9, 1980"
 14 February – "Tear Down The Wall (Zeus version)"
 18 February – "The Wall – Dortmund 18 February 1981"
 19 February – "Tear Down The Wall"
 20 February – "The Wall Dortmund Germany 20 feb. 1981"
 16 June – "Watching The World Upon The Wall"
 17 June – "Live Wall", a.k.a. "The Wall Earl's Court June 17th 1981"

A Momentary Lapse of Reason Tour (1987–1989) 

 9 September – "A New Era"
 12 September – "Montreal Day One", a.k.a. "Echoes by the Lake" and "Final Echoes" (including a complete version of Echoes)
 16 September – "Echoes by the Lake"
 19 September – "Prism"
 28 September – "A Clear View", also released as "On The Turning Away"
 10 October – "Pink Floyd live in East Rutherford 1987 – 2CD – October 10" (140:17 Mins)
 17 October – "Pink Floyd live in Providence 1987 – 2CD – October 17"
 30 September – "Delusions of Maturity"
 1 November – "Pink Floyd live in Miami 1987" [Soundboard Recording]
 03-05/11/1987 – "Would You Buy a Ticket to This Show?"
 26 November – "World Tour"
 27 November – "Pink Floyd live in Los Angeles 1987 – 2CD – November 27"
 11 February – Live In Adelaide 11 2 88
 2 March – Another Lapse in Japan
 4 June – "When You Are Young"
 7 June – "Pink Elephants Flew over Torino"
 21 June – "Château de Versailles (1st day)"
 22 June – "Château de Versailles (2nd day)"
 8 July – "Nothing is Changed"
 2 August – "Another Movie in Long Island" – Live at Nassau Coliseum, Uniondale, New York, USA
 3 June – "Moscow"
 7 July – "Dockland Arena"
 15 July – "A Venezia" [Soundboard Recording]
 30 June – "The Knebworth Tales '90", a.k.a. "Of Promise Broken" (not part of the A Momentary Lapse of Reason Tour) [Soundboard Recording]

The Division Bell Tour (1994) 

 16 March – Norton Air Force Rehearsals (≈ soundboard recording of rehearsal)
 30 March – The Live Bell
 14 April – For Whom The Bell Tolls
 16 April – Your Favorite Disease
 17 April – Jurassic Sparks
 6 May – Just Warmin' Up (Rehearsals)
 11 June – The Bell Gets Louder
 30 July – Bells From Notre Dame
 30 August –  Fly Again The only recorded Pink Floyd Performance of Marooned
 9 September – Confortablement Engourdi en France
 11 September – Lyon 94
 13 September – A Passage of Time (≈ soundboard recording)
 17 September – Mutinae
 17 September – The Concert in Modena
 19 September – The Nights of Wonder
 21 September – The Nights of Wonder
 20 October – Out Of This World (Broadcast/Soundboard, Later Officially released As P.U.L.S.E DVD & Including un-edited Songs)
 29 October – The Last Ever Show
 29 October – The Last Bell

2000s 

 2 July – Live 8, their performance at Live 8

The classic line up of Pink Floyd (David Gilmour, Roger Waters, Richard Wright and Nick Mason) played together on stage for the first time in 24 years (the band toured without Waters in 1987–1989 and 1994).

The band performed the songs "Speak to Me", "Breathe / Breathe (Reprise)", "Money", "Wish You Were Here" and "Comfortably Numb". They were the only band not to be verbally introduced; instead the house and stage lights were darkened while the introduction to "Speak to Me" was played, accompanied on the video screens by an animated version of the heart monitor graphic from The Dark Side of the Moon sleeve. Due to the death of Richard Wright in September 2008, this would be the only reunion of all four members of the post-Syd Barrett incarnation of the band.

 2 July – No More Excuses – Hyde Park – Live 8 (BBC Radio 2 FM Live Broadcast SB)
 10 May – Syd Barrett Tribute London, Barbican Centre, two bonus tracks ("Arnold Layne" and "Bike") on the bootleg "David Gilmour & Rick Wright live in Copenhagen 1988"

Recent releases 

The bootleg label The Godfather released in March 2011 an 8-CD box set of Pink Floyd songs called The Complete Rainbow Tapes. The box contains four Pink Floyd shows, recorded at the Rainbow Theater in London (17–20 February 1972).

In 2012 The Godfather label released a 10-CD box set of Pink Floyd songs called The Massed Gadgets of Hercules 1970–1974. The box contains five Pink Floyd shows, recorded at 14 March 1970, Live at Meistersingerhalle, Nürnberg, West Germany / 13 February 1971, Live at Students Union Bar, TechnicalCollege, Farnborough, Hampshire, England / 16 April 1972, Live at Township Auditorium, Columbia, South Carolina, USA / 12 October 1973, Live at Olympiahalle, München, West Germany / 14 December 1974, Live at Colston Hall, Bristol, Somerset, England.

See also 

 "The Man" and "The Journey"
 The Dark Side of the Moo
 List of unreleased Pink Floyd material
 List of Pink Floyd songs

References 

Bootleg
Bootleg recordings